Roy W. Cornell (December 5, 1943 – January 1, 2004) was a Republican member of the Pennsylvania House of Representatives.

He was a 1961 graduate of Hatboro-Horsham High School and attended Santa Ana Junior College. He graduated from Temple University and from the North Philadelphia Board of Realtors School. He was first elected to represent the 152nd legislative district in the Pennsylvania House of Representatives in 1978. He was the House Republican Caucus Secretary from 1993–94 and was elected Republican Policy Chairman in 1997. He died on January 1, 2004, of a brain tumor.

Legacy
In 2006, Pennsylvania Route 263 (York Road) through Hatboro was named the Roy W. Cornell Memorial Highway in his honor.

References

External links
 official PA House profile (archived)

2004 deaths
Republican Party members of the Pennsylvania House of Representatives
1943 births
20th-century American politicians